Ziana Zain  is the fifth studio album from Malaysian pop singer Ziana Zain released in 1999. The lead single of the album, Syurga Di Hati Kita, was specially composed for her from the composer, as a present for her marriage.

Track listing
 "Syurga Di Hati Kita" (LY, Baiduri) – 5:42
 "Gementar Menghukum Kalbu" (Azmeer, Seni Bayan) – 4:49
 "Kedamaian"  (Azlan Abu Hassan, Ucu) – 4:45
 "Semarak Kasih" (Salman, Awira) – 4:43
 "Perjuangan" (Johari Teh, Jasmi) – 4:16
 "Ada Suara Ada Cinta" (Azman Abu Hassan, Ucu) – 4:42
 "Rahsia Semalam" (Johari Teh, Aryan) – 4:32
 "Penawar Semalu" (Adnan Abu Hassan, Maya Sari) – 4:21
 "Satu Persatu" (Azmeer, Azmira) – 4:07
 "Kesuma Hati" (Adnan Abu Hassan, Maya Sari) – 5:31

Awards

Certification

References

External links
 Fan Site

Ziana Zain albums
1999 albums
Bertelsmann Music Group albums
Malay-language albums